Fred Smith (born April 10, 1948, in New York) is an American bass guitarist, best known for his work with the rock band Television. He was the original bassist with Angel and the Snake, which changed names to Blondie and the Banzai Babies, and then Blondie. He quit in spring 1975 to replace Richard Hell who had left Television over disputes with Tom Verlaine. Hell went on to form The Heartbreakers with Johnny Thunders. At the time, Television played at CBGB along with Blondie. According to Smith, "Blondie was like a sinking ship and Television was my favorite band." He stayed with the band till they broke up in 1978 and rejoined them when they reunited in 1992; the band has played off and on ever since. Smith also participated in the solo albums of the Television guitarists Tom Verlaine and Richard Lloyd, and played with such artists as The Roches, Willie Nile, Peregrins and The Revelons. From 1988 to 1989 he played bass, recorded, and toured with The Fleshtones.

In 1999 he and his wife, artist Paula Cereghino, started making wine in their apartment on Houston Street in New York City's East Village. In 2003 they shifted production to Bloomington, NY and in 2007 formally established their artisanal winery, Cereghino Smith.

References

External links 

[ Fred Smith] at Allmusic
Cereghino Smith Winery- Link dead
Cereghino Smith Winery on Facebook

1948 births
Living people
American rock bass guitarists
Guitarists from New York City
American male bass guitarists
Television (band) members
20th-century American bass guitarists
20th-century American male musicians
Blondie (band) members